In the C programming language, restrict is a keyword, introduced by the C99 standard, that can be used in pointer declarations. By adding this type qualifier, a programmer hints to the compiler that for the lifetime of the pointer, no other pointer will be used to access the object to which it points. This allows the compiler to make optimizations (for example, vectorization) that would not otherwise have been possible.

restrict limits the effects of pointer aliasing, aiding optimizations. If the declaration of intent is not followed and the object is accessed by an independent pointer, this will result in undefined behavior.

Optimization 
If the compiler knows that there is only one pointer to a memory block, it can produce better optimized code. For instance:

void updatePtrs(size_t *ptrA, size_t *ptrB, size_t *val)
{
  *ptrA += *val;
  *ptrB += *val;
}

In the above code, the pointers ptrA, ptrB, and val might refer to the same memory location, so the compiler may generate less optimal code:
; Hypothetical RISC Machine.
ldr r12, [val]     ; Load memory at val to r12.
ldr r3, [ptrA]     ; Load memory at ptrA to r3.
add r3, r3, r12    ; Perform addition: r3 = r3 + r12.
str r3, [ptrA]     ; Store r3 to memory location ptrA, updating the value.
ldr r3, [ptrB]     ; 'load' may have to wait until preceding 'store' completes.
ldr r12, [val]     ; Have to load a second time to ensure consistency.
add r3, r3, r12
str r3, [ptrB]

However, if the restrict keyword is used and the above function is declared as

void updatePtrs(size_t *restrict ptrA, size_t *restrict ptrB, size_t *restrict val);

then the compiler is allowed to assume that ptrA, ptrB, and val point to different locations and updating the memory location referenced by one pointer will not affect the memory locations referenced by the other pointers. The programmer, not the compiler, is responsible for ensuring that the pointers do not point to identical locations.  The compiler can e.g. rearrange the code, first loading all memory locations, then performing the operations before committing the results back to memory.

ldr r12, [val]  ; Note that val is now only loaded once.
ldr r3, [ptrA]  ; Also, all 'load's in the beginning ...
ldr r4, [ptrB]
add r3, r3, r12
add r4, r4, r12
str r3, [ptrA]  ; ... all 'store's in the end.
str r4, [ptrB]

The above assembly code is shorter because val is loaded only once.  Also, since the compiler can rearrange the code more freely, the compiler can generate code that executes faster.  In the second version of the above example, the store operations are all taking place after the load operations, ensuring that the processor won't have to block in the middle of the code to wait until the store operations are complete.

Note that the real generated code may have different behaviors. Benefit with the above mini-example tends to be small, and in real-life cases large loops doing heavy memory access tends to be what is really helped by restrict.

As mentioned above, how incorrect code behaves is undefined, the compiler only ensures the generated code works properly if the code follows the declaration of intent.

Support by C++ compilers 
C++ does not have standard support for restrict, but many compilers have equivalents that usually work in both C++ and C, such as the GCC's and Clang's __restrict__, and Visual C++'s __declspec(restrict). In addition, __restrict is supported by those three compilers. The exact interpretation of these alternative keywords vary by the compiler:

 In Unix-style compilers such as GCC and Clang,  and  mean exactly the same as their C counterpart.
 In Visual C++, multiple no-alias qualifiers are provided:
  applies to the function declaration and hints that the returned pointer is not aliased.
It is also extended for union types.

Compiler warnings
To help prevent incorrect code, some compilers and other tools try to detect when overlapping arguments have been passed to functions with parameters marked .

References

External links

 Demystifying The Restrict Keyword: explanation and examples of use
 
 Restricted Pointers in C: the original rationale behind the definition

C (programming language)